Dnevnik was the first private daily newspaper in Macedonia, now known as North Macedonia.

History and profile
Dnevnik was first published on 20 March 1996. The founders were Mile Jovanovski, Branislav Gjeroski and Aleksandar Damovski. It is published every day except Sunday. Its last editor was Darko Janevski.

On Friday, a supplement called Antena is also published with the newspaper. On Saturday, Vikend is also published with Dnevnik.

Dnevnik ceased circulating on June 13th 2017.

References

External links
 Dnevnik homepage

1996 establishments in the Republic of Macedonia
Publications established in 1996
Newspapers published in North Macedonia
Macedonian-language newspapers
Mass media in Skopje